Peter Finke (born 1944) is a German theoretical physicist who participated in Project-706, Pakistan's clandestine nuclear research project. A close associate and friend of the famous Pakistani nuclear engineer Munir Ahmad Khan (late), he is citizen of both Pakistan and Germany. He is one of the European scientists who participated in Project-706 in the 1970s.

Finke is, perhaps, better known in much of the world for his involvement in the development of Beryllium reflector technology as well as selling this technology to Pakistan in the late 1980s. In 1989, Finke was arrested in Germany by the Interpol Police because of his involvement in nuclear proliferation. However, Germany dropped the allegations due to lack of evidence. Finke was sentenced to jail by the German court in 1989 because of violation of Germany's export control laws.

Biography

Nuclear Proliferation

During the 1970s, Finke was working as a director at Physikalisch-Technische Bundesanstalt where he carried out research in the field of particle physics and was also serving as director of the atomic clock project. According to the Congressional investigation report of 1989, Finke smuggled sensitive nuclear detectors and nuclear technology to Pakistan in the late 1980s without notifying the German Government. The report also says that he also smuggled beryllium nuclear reflectors and sensitive research publications to Pakistan in 1972.

Project-706
Finke, who was contacted by nuclear physicist turned-diplomat Siddique Ahmad Butt, better known as S. A. Butt, also passed on sensitive research publications to Butt. Finke first visited Pakistan when a German nuclear firm signed a civilian nuclear technology agreement with PAEC. However, later, Finke moved to Pakistan in 1975 to train Pakistani scientists in the field of nuclear reactor technology under the mutual agreement. When the German nuclear fuel supplier firm terminated the contract due to Finke's involvement in Project-706; Finke decided to live in Pakistan where he trained a number of Pakistani scientists in the field of nuclear reactor-device technology

PINSTECH career
Finke moved to Pakistan in 1980 where he joined Project-706 under the leadership of Munir Ahmad Khan and Abdul Qadeer Khan. Finke, eventually, worked at the Pakistan Institute of Nuclear Science and Technology (PINSTECH) as a researcher and produced a number of research publications along with his fellow Pakistani nuclear scientists. However, Finke was carefully excluded from Pakistan's nuclear weapons development program and was tasked to provide research publications. At PINSTECH, Peter Finke was involved in nuclear reactor technology where he researched and provided personal assistance to Pakistani scientists in nuclear reactor technology. According to his personal account, the Congressional report has stated that "There is no doubt that Munir Ahmed Khan, chief of the Pakistan Nuclear Authority, with whom Finke already had a cup of tea, has secretly developed his country into a nuclear power; the bomb puzzle is complete. He had many individual parts – ranging from transformer sheets to uranium conversion —supplied by small West German firms, using a network of agents to this end.

Finke was instrumental in the development of Tritium reflector technology for Pakistan's nuclear weapons. Finke produced research publications on Beryllium, Tritium and Thorium reflectors which were passed on to the Pakistani nuclear scientists to develop nuclear weapons. Because of his services, Finke was awarded Sitara-i-Imtiaz by the then President of Pakistan General Muhammad Zia-ul-Haq. Finke continued to carry out research in Pakistan's nuclear program till 1989. Later, he was transferred to PINSTECH's Nuclear Physics Division (NPD) where he became a distinguished professor of particle physics. Later, he became a full professor of high energy physics. He obtained Pakistani citizenship in 1985.

Arrest and sentence to jail
In 1989, Finke was arrested through a joint operation of German Police and Interpol in Germany. Finke, who was in Germany for a personal vacation, was arrested by the German Police and jailed for violating the German export control laws. The following year, Finke was charged with nuclear proliferation where he confessed his involvement in the Pakistani nuclear program.

The German court found him guilty and he served a jail term in a German Prison. Finke's personal information and details have been kept secret by the Governments of Pakistan and Germany. Both Pakistan and Germany refused to provide more details regarding the scientist. The trial went fast and most of the information regarding the case was not released by Pakistan and Germany to the international press. After serving his jail term, Finke has been monitored closely by intelligence agencies and was reported to have moved back to Pakistan with his family where he became a foreign professor of particle physics at the Quaid-i-Azam University, Islamabad.

References

External links
Congressional Report of 1989 See Nuclear Exports to Pakistan Reported 
http://www.nuclearactive.org/docs/LES021904a.html
See Document No.2964

Pakistani physicists
Scientists from North Rhine-Westphalia
German emigrants to Pakistan
20th-century German physicists
Nuclear proliferation
Project-706
1944 births
Living people
Pakistani spies
Scientists from Bonn
People from Islamabad
Academic staff of Quaid-i-Azam University
Recipients of Sitara-i-Imtiaz
Theoretical physicists
Naturalised citizens of Pakistan